Wheelchair racing at the Summer Olympics featured as demonstration competitions at the multi-sport event, appearing within the Olympic athletics programme from 1984 to 2004. On each occasion two track races were held: a men's 1500 metres race and a women's 800 metres race. This was the first time events for disabled athletes have featured at the Summer Olympic Games, with the Paralympic Games being the traditional venue for top level para-athletics. The wheelchair races were the second Olympic exhibition event for disabled athletes, following on from the disabled skiing at the 1984 Winter Olympics, held earlier that year.

Unofficial medals were awarded to the competitors by Juan Antonio Samaranch, the International Olympic Committee president. The events were dropped prior to the 2008 Beijing Olympics and multiple Paralympic gold medallist Chantal Petitclerc stated the decision was a major set-back for the sport, as she favoured its official integration as an Olympic sport.

At the inaugural event in 1984 Sharon Hedrick broke the IPC world record to win the women's 800 m in a time of 2:15.73 minutes. This was followed by two record performances in 1992, when Claude Issorat of France set a men's 1500 m record of 3:13.92 minutes and Denmark's Connie Hansen won the 800 m in a record 1:55.62 minutes. The Olympic records for the event were set by Saúl Mendoza, who finished in 3:06.75 minutes to win the 2000 men's 1500 m race, and Chantal Petitclerc, who won the last women's 800 m event in 1:53.66 minutes in 2004. Issorat, Hedrick and Louise Sauvage each won two Olympic wheelchair races; Issorat and Sauvage had three Olympic podium finishes. The United States had the most success in the event, gathering eleven medals over the six editions.

Medalists

Men

Multiple medalists

Medalists by country

Women

Multiple medalists

Medalists by country

References
Participation and results data
Athletics Women's 800 metres Wheelchair Medalists. Sports Reference. Retrieved on 2014-05-22.
Athletics Men's 1,500 metres Wheelchair Medalists. Sports Reference. Retrieved on 2014-05-12.
Specific

External links
Official Olympics website

Wheelchair racing
Olympics
Discontinued sports at the Summer Olympics
Para-athletics competitions